James Thorpe may refer to:
James Thorpe (soccer) (born 1985), American soccer player
James Thorpe (academic) (1915–2009), professor of English at Princeton University
James Thorpe (TV producer), Canadian television producer, television writer
James Thorpe (Ohio politician) (1927–2007), member of the Ohio House of Representatives
James Thorpe (cricketer) (born 1991), English cricketer

See also
James Thorp (1937–2018), head of the Bradley Department of Electrical and Computer Engineering at Virginia Tech
Jim Thorpe (disambiguation)